Wat Pasantidhamma (or "Wat Pa"), meaning "a peaceful temple in the woods", is a Thai Theravada Buddhist temple located at 14289 Chapmans Lane in rural Carrollton, Virginia. It is a non-profit religious organization serving the Thai and Thai American communities. Established as the first Buddhist temple in the Tidewater (southeastern) region of Virginia in 1998, it remains as of 2010 one of three in the State.

See also
 Abhayagiri Buddhist Monastery, Redwood Valley, California
 San Fran Dhammaram Temple, San Francisco
 Vajiradhammapadip Temple, Centereach and Mount Vernon in New York
 Wat Boston Buddha Vararam, Bedford, Massachusetts
 Wat Buddhananachat of Austin, Del Valle, Texas
 Wat Buddhasamakeevanaram, Bossier City, Louisiana
 Wat Buddhanusorn, Fremont, California
 Wat Carolina Buddhajakra Vanaram, Bolivia, North Carolina
 Wat Florida Dhammaram, Kissimmee, Florida
 Wat Mettāvarānaṁ, Valley Center, California
 Wat Mongkolratanaram, Berkeley, California
 Wat Mongkolratanaram, Tampa, Florida
 Wat Nawamintararachutis, Raynham, Massachusetts

Notes

Further reading

External links

Religious institutions in Hampton Roads

Buddhist temples in Virginia
Asian-American culture in Virginia
Buildings and structures in Isle of Wight County, Virginia
Thai Theravada Buddhist temples and monasteries
Thai-American culture
Overseas Thai Buddhist temples